In physics, the Lemaître–Tolman metric, also known as the Lemaître–Tolman–Bondi metric or the Tolman metric, is a Lorentzian metric based on an exact solution of Einstein's field equations; it describes an isotropic and expanding (or contracting) universe which is not homogeneous, and is thus used in cosmology as an alternative to the standard Friedmann–Lemaître–Robertson–Walker metric to model the expansion of the universe. It has also been used to model a universe which has a fractal distribution of matter to explain the accelerating expansion of the universe. It was first found by Georges Lemaître in 1933 and Richard Tolman in 1934 and later investigated by Hermann Bondi in 1947.

Details

The solution of the field equations yield

 

We can also assume  and  that excludes cases resulting in crossing of material particles during its motion. This prediction is evidently similar to the Newtonian theory. The total mass within the sphere  is given by

The function  can be obtained upon integration and is given in a parametric form with a parameter  with three possibilities,
 
 
 

where  emerges as another arbitrary function. However, we know that centrally symmetric matter distribution can be described by at most two functions, namely their density distribution and the radial velocity of the matter. This means that of the three functions , only two are independent. In fact, since no particular selection has been made for the Lagrangian coordinate  yet that can be subjected to arbitrary transformation, we can see that only two functions are arbitrary.

Schwarzschild solution

When const.,  and therefore the solution corresponds to empty space with a point mass located at the center.

Gravitational collapse
The moment  corresponds to the arrival of matter denoted by its Lagrangian coordinate  to the center.

in which the first two relations indicate that in the comoving frame, all radial distances tend to infinity and tangential distances approaches zero like , whereas the third relation shows that the matter density increases like  In the special case constant where the time of collapse of all the material particle is the same, the asymptotic behaviors are different,

Here both the tangential and radial distances goes to zero like , whereas the matter density increases like

See also

Lemaître coordinates
Introduction to the mathematics of general relativity
Stress–energy tensor
Metric tensor (general relativity)
Relativistic angular momentum
inhomogeneous cosmology

References 

Physical cosmology
Metric tensors
Spacetime
Coordinate charts in general relativity
General relativity
Gravity
Exact solutions in general relativity